Camrose Airport  is located adjacent to Camrose, Alberta, Canada.

Amenities in the airport include pilot lounge, washrooms, and a soft drink vending machine which are available 24 hours a day, seven days a week, via pilot access only. There is 24-hour self-serve Avgas (100LL) fuel available. Communications ARCAL system is activated by five clicks on 122.8 MHz. A computer is available for pilots to obtain weather and NOTAM information.
 
Communication: 
 Unicom 122.8 MHz 
 Navigation NDB 405 kHz DME 108.2

Tie-downs are limited to in-pavement locations, with no fees (24 hour maximum per use).

References

External links
Page about this airport (Archived) on COPA's Places to Fly airport directory

Certified airports in Alberta
Camrose, Alberta